The Americas Zone was one of the three zones of the regional Davis Cup competition in 1999.

In the Americas Zone there were four different tiers, called groups, in which teams competed against each other to advance to the upper tier.

Group I

Winners in Group I advanced to the World Group Qualifying Round, along with losing teams from the World Group first round. Teams who lost their respective ties competed in the relegation play-offs, with winning teams remaining in Group I, whereas teams who lost their play-offs were relegated to the Americas Zone Group II in 2000.

Participating nations

Group II
Winners in Group II advanced to the Americas Zone Group I. Teams who lost their respective ties competed in the relegation play-offs, with winning teams remaining in Group II, whereas teams who lost their play-offs were relegated to the Americas Zone Group III in 2000.

Participating nations

Group III

Participating nations

Group IV

The top two teams in Group IV advanced to the Americas Zone Group III in 2000. All other teams remained in Group IV.

Participating nations

References

External links
Davis Cup official website

 
Davis Cup Americas Zone
Americas Zone